Deeya is a given name. Notable people with the name include:

 Deeya Suzannah Bajaj (born 1994), Indian adventure sports athlete
 Deeya Chopra (born 1985), Indian actress
 Deeya Maskey, Nepalese actress and dancer

See also
 Deeyah
 Diya (disambiguation)